Chisago Lakes is an area of Chisago County, Minnesota, along Highway 8. The Chisago Lakes Area Chamber of Commerce includes the combined areas of Shafer, Center City, Chisago City, and Lindström.

History
The Chisago Lakes Area is named after an Indian phrase, "Ki Chi Saga," which means "fair & lovely waters." The Swedish called it "The Big Lake," as many of today's lakes were once one large lake. Swedish immigrants settled in the Chisago Lakes area in the mid-19th century. The area became a popular tourist area, with the lakes and railroad coming through. The Depression years dried up the lakes and the tourists. There was a growth of tourism in the late 1940s, as the lakes began to prosper once again.

Cities  	  	  	 

Chisago City, Minnesota

Sister-city to Algutsboda, Sweden

Originally platted in 1855, Chisago City was replatted at another location in 1892 and incorporated in 1906. Chisago City became a tourist resort destination after the 1880 railroad was built. Chisago City was home to Vilhelm Moberg during the summer of 1947, while he rode his bike through the area researching for what would become his four-volume saga of Swedish Immigrants in North America, The Emigrants suite: The Emigrants, Unto a Good Land, The Settlers and The Last Letter Home. The city has dedicated a park and a statue, housed in the park, to Vilhelm Moberg.  

Center City, Minnesota

Sister-City to Hassela, Sweden

Center City was founded in 1851 and was the first permanent Swedish settlement in Minnesota. It became the county seat in 1875. The Chisago Lakes Lutheran Church was the first Swedish settled church in the area, being organized in 1854 in the barn of Per Berg. Highway 8 follows much of the old railroad bed through the city of Center City. Today, two blocks along Summit Avenue, including 18 homes, form a historic district listed on the National Register of Historic Places.

Lindström, Minnesota

Sister-City to Tingsryd, Sweden

Lindström, the largest city in the Chisago Lakes area is Sister-city to Tingsryd, Sweden. Lindström was platted in 1880 and officially founded in 1894 and named after Daniel Lindström from Hassela, Hälsingland, Sweden. Karl Oskar and his wife, Kristina are central to the city's celebrations. They are fictitious characters, representing the many immigrant families that settled in the "land of kichisaga" in the mid-19th century. They'd fled from a life of struggle in their homeland of Småland, Sweden to rebuild their lives in an unclaimed territory. A statue of Karl and Kristina symbolize the Swedish peasants who migrated to America over one hundred years ago, settling in the Chisago Lakes area.

Shafer, Minnesota

Sister-City to Nöbbele, Sweden

Shafer is a farming community and was once a potato hub.  Shafer was first organized as part of Taylors Falls, Minnesota.  In 1853 the town was renamed after a transient farm worker, Jacob Shafer, from Sweden.  The Shafer community is proud of its heritage.  Throughout the year, events are held in a "town square" type of atmosphere.

See also
U.S. Highway 8
Chisago Lakes School District

References

External links
Chisago Lakes Chamber of Commerce
Chisago Lakes

Geography of Chisago County, Minnesota
History of Minnesota